Eliza Firmansjah "Lies" Noor (July 12, 1943 – March 14, 1961) was an Indonesian actress and model.

She went on hiatus from acting after giving birth to her first child, later returning to cinema in 1960 with Pedjuang (Warriors for Freedom). Noor died of encephalitis on March 14, 1961, and was buried in Karet Bivak Cemetery.

Biography 

Lies Noor was born on July 12, 1943, in Batavia, Dutch East Indies, to Mohammad Noor. in an interview with Varia magazine, she said that she came from an old-fashioned family which did not want her to act. Thinking that she could retire from acting immediately afterwards to work—like her role model Maria Ulfah Santoso—for social betterment, Noor accepted the role. Pulang was released to acclaim, with a review in De Nieuwsgier highlighting Noor as vibrant and photogenic.

Noor rapidly gained popularity in Indonesia for her acting, and soon offers came from other directors and producers. She appeared in Rentjong dan Surat in 1953, followed by Kopral Djono in 1954. In an August 1954 article for Film Varia magazine, Haznam Rahman described Noor as a new hope for Indonesian cinema, having found the greatest place in audiences' hearts despite her short filmography. He expressed hope that her future would be a bright one, and recommended that she migrate from Gabungan Artis Film (Association of Film Artists, GAF) to a larger studio such as Persari or Perfini.

Noor was most productive in 1955, when she appeared in five different films: Gagal (Failure), Peristiwa Didanau Toba (The Lake Toba Incident), Sampai Berdjumpa Kembali (Until We Meet Again), Ibu dan Putri (Mother and Daughter), and Oh, Ibuku (Oh, Mother). She was able to demand Rp 10,000 for a film produced in Jakarta or Rp 12,500 for a film produced outside of the city. When she was approached by Honey Motion Pictures for Awan dan Tjemara (Clouds and Pines, 1955), she refused to take the lead role as she was only offered Rp 7,500; the role went to a newcomer, Triana.

In 1956, Noor went to Hong Kong with the Indonesian delegation to the 3rd Asia-Pacific Film Festival. That year she acted in three films: Melati Sendja (Twilight Jasmine), Peristiwa 10 Nopember (The 10 November Incident), and Rajuan Alam (Call of Nature). The last of these starred Noor alongside  as a husband and wife who must deal with malaria. For Rajuan Alam, in 1957 Noor travelled to Tokyo with her co-star for the 4th Asia-Pacific Film Festival, where the film was in competition under the title A House, a Wife, a Singing Bird.

Noor married Firmansjah (also known as Dick Ninkeula), a Produksi Film Negara employee whom she had met on the set of Pulang, in the mid-1950s, soon after graduating senior high school. After gave birth to her only son, Rio Marcel Firmansjah-Ninkeula, Noor took a hiatus from acting. She explained to Varia in a 1959 interview that she intended to focus on raising Rio until he was old enough for her to return to acting.

Noor returned to cinema in 1960's Pedjuang (Warriors for Freedom), a film directed by Usmar Ismail which followed a platoon of Indonesian soldiers during the Indonesian National Revolution. She made her final film, Pesan Ibu (Mother's Message), in 1961. In this film, she played a young woman who had to help her mother support their family after their father's death.

On 12 March 1961, Noor was admitted to Cikini Hospital, Jakarta, and treated for encephalitis. She died two days later at the age of 17, and was buried on 15 March at Karet Bivak Cemetery. At the funeral several film figures provided eulogies, including Djamaluddin Malik, and Basuki Effendy. Among the mourners were Chitra Dewi, Sofia Waldy, Bing Slamet, and Astaman.

Filmography
In her nine-year career, Noor appeared in thirteen films.

Pulang (1952)
Rentjong dan Surat (1953)
Kopral Djono (1954)
Gagal (1955)
Peristiwa Didanau Toba (1955)
Sampai Berdjumpa Kembali (1955)
Ibu dan Putri (1955)
Oh, Ibuku (1955)
Rajuan Alam (1956)
Melati Sendja (1956)
Peristiwa 10 Nopember (1956)
Pedjuang (1960)
Pesan Ibu (1961)

Explanatory notes

Citations

Works cited

External links

 

1943 births
1961 deaths
20th-century Dutch East Indies people
20th-century Indonesian actresses
Actresses from Jakarta
Actresses of the Dutch East Indies
Film child actresses
Indonesian child actresses
Indonesian film actresses
20th-century Dutch women